Waterloo Dock is a dock on the River Mersey, England, and part of the Port of Liverpool. It is situated in the northern dock system in Vauxhall and connected to Princes Half Tide Dock to the south. The site of Victoria Dock is located to the north.

History
The dock was designed by Jesse Hartley and opened in 1834 as Waterloo Dock, named after the Battle of Waterloo. 

In 1843 an observatory was built here for astronomical and meteorological observations and to provide accurate time for ships' chronometers.
In 1866, when the dock was redeveloped, the observatory was relocated to Bidston Hill on the Wirral Peninsula.

In 1868, Waterloo Dock was split in two separate basins; East Waterloo Dock and West Waterloo Dock. 

Initially planned eleven years earlier, the lock entrance from the Mersey was finally opened in 1949. Construction was delayed due to the Second World War.

The dock closed to shipping in 1988. The entrance channel from the river and part of the dock has since been filled.

In 2007, work began on a £20 million extension of the Leeds and Liverpool Canal, providing a further  of navigable waterway and encompassing Princes Half Tide Dock. 
A new -wide channel from Trafalgar Dock to the northern end of West Waterloo Dock will be excavated as part of the canal route. 

The extensive Waterloo Warehouse has since been converted into residential apartments.

References

Sources

Further reading

External links

 
 East & West Waterloo Docks aerial photo
 Waterloo Dock

Liverpool docks
Redeveloped ports and waterfronts in Merseyside